Alex James Murphy (born June 3, 1993) is an American-Finnish professional basketball player. He played college basketball for Duke University, the University of Florida and Northeastern University. He is the son of former National Basketball Association (NBA) player Jay Murphy, and the brother of former NBA forward Erik Murphy. He plays for the Finnish national team.

High school career
Murphy was ranked as the No. 41 player in the ESPNU 100, the No. 45 player by Rivals.com, and the No. 41 player by Scout.com.  He attended St. Mark's School in Southborough, Massachusetts, where he played alongside Kaleb Tarczewski and Nik Stauskas.  Murphy led St. Mark's School to a 27–3 record as a junior. Murphy was also named NEPSAC ISL Player of the Year in 2011. In April 2011, he decided to forgo his senior year of high school and join the class of 2011. This allowed Murphy to graduate in the spring of 2011 and attend Duke University in the fall of that year.  Murphy left St. Mark's School and attended South Kingstown High School for the remaining months in order to graduate and enroll at Duke that summer.

AAU
Murphy played for the Adidas sponsored New England Playaz Basketball Club.

College recruitment

|}

Murphy committed to play basketball at Duke on February 7, 2011.  Recruiting columnists speculated that he would commit to the University of Florida because his older brother, Erik Murphy, was a four-year player under coach Billy Donovan.  Murphy chose Duke over Florida, Arizona, Boston College, North Carolina, Villanova and West Virginia.

Reclassification
On April 19, 2011, Murphy announced that he would reclassify and be graduating a year early from St. Mark's School and would enroll at Duke University a year earlier than expected. Having met all academic requirements necessary to do this, Murphy was able to enroll at Duke in the summer of 2011, and was the fifth member of Duke's 2011 recruiting class. "It was a very difficult decision but at the end of the day, I thought this was the best thing for my future," Murphy said. "It's a great opportunity."

College

Redshirt (2011-2012)
In December 2011, Murphy decided to redshirt his freshman season with fellow recruit Marshall Plumlee. Murphy said, "It's still to be determined, but a redshirt year is most likely what I'm going to do. That's the plan right now." after No. 5 Duke beat Washington, 86–80, at Madison Square Garden.

Professional career
On August 4, 2017, Murphy signed his first professional contract with Joensuun Kataja of the Finnish Korisliiga.

On July 13, 2018, Murphy signed a one-year deal with Szolnoki Olaj KK of the Hungarian League.

On August 5, 2019, he signed with Delteco Gipuzkoa Basket.

International
Murphy played for Finland at the FIBA U20 European Championships in the summer of 2012.
Murphy is now a member of the Finnish men's national team.

References

External links
Florida Gators bio
Duke Blue Devils bio
ESPN.com Profile

1993 births
Living people
American expatriate basketball people in Hungary
American men's basketball players
American people of Finnish descent
Basketball players from Rhode Island
Duke Blue Devils men's basketball players
Finnish men's basketball players
Florida Gators men's basketball players
Kataja BC players
Northeastern Huskies men's basketball players
People from Washington County, Rhode Island
Small forwards
Szolnoki Olaj KK players